John Henry Clippinger III is a researcher, entrepreneur, and activist around decentralized, autonomous, self-organizing systems with a focus on generative governance and finance for climate change and social equity.

He is the author of A Crowd of One: The Future of Individual Identity (Perseus, Public Affairs, 2007) and a number of other books and publications. He edited The Biology of Business: Decoding the Natural Laws of Enterprises (Jossey Bass, 1998), contributed to The Reputation Society: How Online Opinions Are Reshaping The Offline World, and co-edited (with David Bollier) From Bitcoin to Burning Man and Beyond: The Quest for Identity and Autonomy in a Digital Society.

He contributed to the "A Renaissance of the Commons: How the New Sciences and Internet are Framing a New Global Identity and Order" chapter in Code: Collaboration, Ownership and the Digital Economy (Cambridge, Mass.: MIT Press.2009) Social Physics, Designing New Social Institutions (The Center for Natural and Social Science, Chinese Academy of Science, Beijing China, September; 2007), On Protecting One’s Good Name: An Inquiry into Effective Reputation and Rating Systems, in 'Hassan Massum, (Mark Tovey, editors,  Digital Innovation in Governance: New Rules for Sharing and Protecting Private Information, and with the Kauffman Task Force on Law, Innovation, and Growth, Rules for Growth; Promoting Innovation and Growth Through Legal Reform, p. 381-407, 2011, Marion Kauffman Foundation.

He is a contributor to Techonomy.com, and The American Banker.

Early life

John Henry Clippinger Jr. was born in Cincinnati, Ohio. to John and Jane Clippinger. His father was a former prosecutor of Prohibition Era gangsters, and a senior partner at Taft Stettinius and Hollister, where he was active in civic affairs, Republican politics, competitive timber racing and show jumping, Master of the Camargo Hunt, and a close associate of Sen. Robert A. Taft.  John attended Walnut Hills High School and Taft School, Watertown, Connecticut. He had two sisters Sarah and Jane Judith, both now deceased. His great grandfather, Rev. John Henry Clippinger, was a circuit minister and Abolitionist, and his grandfather, a lawyer, oilman in Texas, and real estate developer.

He is also a descendant of William Phelps a Puritan magistrate and one of the founders of Dorchester, Mass, in 1630, and of Windsor, Connecticut in 1637, and William Phelps was one of eight selected to lead the first democratic town government in the American colonies. The Phelps family played a prominent role in the American Revolution and the formation and architecture of Manhattan.

He graduated from Yale University, where he was active in the early civil rights, social activism and anti-war groups After his freshman year, he worked for a Dr. James Turpin with Project Concern in clinics in the “Walled City” of Hong Kong and with refugee Chinese boat people. On March 9, 1965, he was among a small group of white students to participate in the Selma, Alabama “Turnaround Tuesday” March over the Edmund Pettus Bridge. In the same year, he became president of ARFEP (Americans for Reappraisal of Far Eastern Policy) founded with William Sloan Coffin as the first university opposition to the Vietnam War. He worked with John Fairbanks of Harvard and Congressman Allard Lowenstein to sponsor the first full-page New York Times petition against the United States China and Vietnam war policy. He was also active in the 1963 March on Washington for Jobs and Freedom and a marshal for the 1967 Vietnam Protest march. He was Social Chairman of St. Anthony Hall, Aurelian Honor Society and completed his Anthropology honors thesis, “Steersman and the Stars: A Cybernetic Analysis of Myth.”

Graduate school and early career

Clippinger received a fellowship to the University of Pennsylvania, Annenberg School, where he studied cybernetics and information theory, completing his master’s thesis on a computer simulation and statistical analysis of adaptation strategies for “self-organizing symbolic system”. While in graduate school in Philadelphia, he worked with the Black Panther Breakfast program and Hispanic Young Lords and North Philadelphia gangs to mitigate youth violence. He entered the University of Pennsylvania doctoral program to study content analysis, computational linguistics and Artificial Intelligence. While in graduate school he worked as a research associate at the Brandeis University Florence Heller School, where he applied cybernetics, systems theory and simulation models to the design and delivery of integrated and accountable human services. From 1972- 1975, he undertook his thesis research at the MIT Artificial Intelligence Lab working with Terry Winograd, and with the support of Stephen Kosslyn, he published it as a book, Meaning and Discourse: A Computational Model of Psychoanalytic Cognition and Discourse, Johns Hopkins University Press, 1979. It was the first computer model of distributed, multi-agent cognition and discourse composition derived from the transcribed discourse. In 1976–1979, Clippinger became a research fellow at Harvard’s Information Resources Policy Program working with Professor Anthony Oettinger, where he conducted research on cross border data flow, telecommunications and development and information privacy. In 1978-80, he became an Expert Advisor for the formation of the National Telecommunications and Information Administration, and Art Bushnell helped formulate some of the United States' first information policy.

In 1980 Clippinger founded one of the first artificial NLP (natural language processing) software companies, Brattle Research Corp. The company was an early innovator in natural language processing, content categorization, object-oriented databases, financial trading compliance and oversight, LIBOR interest rate swaps, and “information refining” strategies. The company was funded by competing LISP machine vendors, Texas Instruments and Symbolics, and partnered with Dow Jones online services to prototype a bitmap graphic, semantically indexed and linked version of the Wall Street Journal. When the company was sold, Clippinger joined for seven years Coopers & Lybrand, where he became Director, Intellectual Capital and developed one of the first fully automated semantic classification intranet services, called CLIPS (Coopers & Lybrand Intellectual Property Service). Clippinger founded three other companies (Context Media, Lexeme/LingoMotors/ EcoCap/Azigo) and he then consulted on networked organizations to the Command and Control Research Program (CCRP) in the Office of the Assistant Secretary of Defense (Networks, Information and Integration) before becoming a Senior Fellow at the Harvard Law School Berkman Center for Internet and Society. During this time, he was also active as an Aspen Institute Fellow and member of the Santa Fe Business Network. At the Berkman Center for Internet and Society, he founded the Social Physics project and co-founded Project Higgins  for user control over personal data and the Law Lab with a grant from the Kauffman Foundation.

He is co-founder and executive director of ID3 (Institute for Innovation & Data Driven Design), a 501 C(3) non-profit organization formed to develop and field test legal and software trust frameworks for distributed, self-signing digital assets, currencies, and data-driven services, infrastructures, and enterprises. He is also a research affiliate at the MIT Media Lab’s City Science Group working on concepts for local token economies and algorithmic zoning.

Affiliations

Clippinger has been a member of the World Economic Forum Global Advisory Council, the Risk Analysis Network for the World Economic Forum, The Highlands Forum The Santa Fe Institute, Aspen Institute, and others according to his biography page at the Aspen Institute. John Clippinger is currently the Co-Director of the Law Lab - the Berkman Center Internet & Society, Harvard.  He is also a core member of City Science group at MIT Media Lab.

He was a delegate of the E-G8 Forum, participated in the Creative Leadership Summit,Fortune Brainstorm, a contributor to Massachusetts Institute of Technology Mobile Territorial Labs, Monaco Media Forum, and Ashoka.
John is the co-founder of the Token Commons Foundation which is a Zug based organization with fellow co-founders Evan Caron and John Redpath.

References

External links

Law Lab

Living people
Artificial intelligence researchers
Yale University alumni
American male writers
Annenberg School for Communication at the University of Pennsylvania alumni
Year of birth missing (living people)